The New Brunswick Telephone Company, Limited (operating as NBTel) was a telecommunications company that operated in the Canadian province of New Brunswick. The company was founded in 1888 after Bell Telephone Company of Canada's attempt to establish telephone service in the Maritimes failed and purchased Bell Canada's New Brunswick assets in 1889. In 1973, NBTel purchased the last independent telephone operator in New Brunswick, giving it a monopoly for telephone service in the province.

In 1924, the company built a telephone exchange in Sackville, New Brunswick. An extension was made in 1961 in order to house more equipment. Two years later, the building was sold to the Maritime Conference of the United Church of Canada.

Owned by holding company Bruncor, which Bell Canada gained a controlling interest in during the 1960s, NBTel was based in Saint John, New Brunswick, until its merger with the other Stentor Alliance companies in Atlantic Canada to form Aliant in 1999. In 2006, it is now known as Bell Aliant.

Firsts
 NBTel was the first telephone company in Canada to be given Canadian Radio-television and Telecommunications Commission approval to provide television services in 1998 and was the first to launch this into service in 1999.
 NBTel was the first Canadian telephone company to provide internet service.
 In 1993, NBTel became the first telephone company in North America to use a fully digital switching network.
 NBTel was the first company to offer all customers voice mail service.

References
 Information on NBTel at acssoftware.com
 Information on NBTel at informationbuilders.com

External links 

 New Brunswick Telephone Company, Limited - Canadian Corporate Reports

Telecommunications companies of Canada
Companies based in Saint John, New Brunswick
Bell Aliant
Canadian companies established in 1888
Telecommunications companies disestablished in 1999
Telecommunications companies established in 1888